Gaute Høberg Vetti (born 2 September 1998) is a Norwegian professional footballer who plays for Bodø/Glimt, as a midfielder.

Career
Born in Bergen, Vetti has played club football for Sarpsborg 08.

He has represented Norway at under-21 level.

Career statistics

References

1998 births
Living people
Norwegian footballers
Sarpsborg 08 FF players
FK Bodø/Glimt players
Eliteserien players
Association football midfielders
Norway under-21 international footballers
SK Brann players
Nest-Sotra Fotball players
Footballers from Bergen